The Battle of Vézeronce took place on June 25, 524 near Vézeronce-Curtin (then Veseruntia) in Isère, France. This battle was part of an invasion of Burgundy initiated by the four successors of the Frankish king Clovis I: Childebert I, Chlodomer, Chlothar I, and Theuderic I.

The previous Burgundian king, Sigismund, had been executed by the Franks, and was succeeded by his brother Godomar. Godomar led the Burgundian army and inflicted a severe defeat on the Franks, with Chlodomer killed during the fighting. However, the defeat of the Franks was only temporary and the kingdom was lost to the Merovingians within a decade.

A helmet was found in the peat marsh of Saint-Didier, to the north of the battle site in 1871 and is conserved in the Musée dauphinois, Grenoble. The helmet is of Byzantine craftsmanship and was probably that of a Frankish chieftain.

Notes

External links
Collections Archéologie at the Musée dauphinois website.
The Conversion of Clovis at the Encyclopædia Britannica website.

References

524
Vézeronce
Vezeronce
Vezeronce
Vezeronce
Vezeronce
Vézeronce
Isère
6th century in Francia